The following is a list of Romanian TV series.

1970s

1971 
 Urmǎrirea (The chase) - TVR; drama/war

1972 
 Cireșarii - TVR; adventure

1973 
 Un august în flăcări (An August in flames) - TVR; drama/war
 Pistruiatul (That freckled kid) - TVR; war

1977 
 Toate pânzele sus! (Raise the sails!) - TVR; adventure

1979 
 Lumini și umbre (Lights and shadows) - TVR (1979-1982); drama

1980s

1984 
 Eroii nu au varstă (Not too young to be a hero) - TVR; adventure/war
 Racheta albă (White rocket) - TVR; adventure

1986 
 Ochii care nu se văd... (What the eyes don't see..) - TVR (1986/1994); drama

1990s

1993 
 Inelul cu briliant (The diamond ring) - TVR; crime

1994 
 Călătorie de neuitat (Unforgettable journey) - TVR; adventure

1999 
 1, 2, 3 - Pro TV; sitcom
 Boier Moflea and Voda - Pro TV (1992-2002); sitcom
 Garcea - Pro TV (1999-2003); sitcom
 Big Vacation - Pro TV; sitcom

2000s

2003 
 La Bloc (Living in a Block) - Pro TV; sitcom (2002-2008 on Pro TV ; 2009-present on PRO Cinema)
 Leana ṣi Costel (Leana and Costel) - Pro TV, Kanal D; sitcom (2003-2012)

2005 
 Bǎieṭi Buni (Good Boyz) - Pro TV - action (2005)
 Numai iubirea (Just Love) - Acasǎ - soap-opera (2005-present)
 Trǎsniţi în N.A.T.O. (Crazies in N.A.T.O.) - Prima TV  (2003-2009)
 Secretul Mariei (Maria's Secret) - Antena 1 (2005-2006)

2006 
 Lacrimi de Iubire (Love Tears) - Acasǎ - soap-opera (2004-present)
 Lombarzilor 8
 Mondenii (The Mondens) - Prima TV - sitcom (2006-2017) (currently shown as Mondenii Show)
 Pǎcatele Evei (Eve's Sins) - Acasǎ; soap-opera (2004-2005)
 Rǎzboiul Sexelor (War of Genders) - Acasǎ; sitcom (2007-2014)
 Vocea Inimii/La Voz de Corazon (Hearth's Voice) - Antena 1; soap-opera (2006-2007)

2007 
 17 - O Poveste despre Destin (17 - A story about the destiny) - Prima TV; drama (2008-2016) (a 2nd season is in projects)
 Cu un pas înainte (A step ahead) - Pro Cinema -  sitcom (2007-2013)
 Gipsy Heart (Romanian: Inimǎ de Ṭigan) - Acasǎ; the most successful Romanian soap-opera (2007-present)
 Îngeraṣii (The Little Angels) - Acasǎ; sitcom (September 15, 2008-present)
 Iubire ca-n Filme (Love as in the Movies) - Acasǎ; soap-opera (2007-present)
 Daria, iubirea mea (Daria, My Love) - Acasǎ; soap-opera (2007-present)
 Secretul Mariei (Mary's Secret) - Antena 1; drama (2005-2006)
 Trǎsniṭi din Nato - a spin-off of Trasniti in N.A.T.O.; Prima TV (2009-2021)

2008 
 Arestat la Domiciliu (Home Arrest) - Pro Cinema; sitcom (2008-present)
 Nimeni Nu-i Perfect (Nobody's Perfect) - Prima TV - sitcom (2007-2021)
 Regina (The Queen) - spin-off of Gipsy Heart; Acasǎ; soap-opera (2008-present)
 Scene de Cǎsnicie (Marriage Scenes) - Antena 1 - sitcom/drama (2008-2012)
 Vine Poliṭia! (The Police is coming!) - Pro Cinema; action (2008-2013)

2009 

 State de România (State of Romania) - Acasǎ - spin-off of Regina ( 2009- 
 Aniela (Aniela) - Acasă - soap opera (2009-present)

2010s

2010 
 Spionii din Vecini (Spies Next Door) - OTV; children's (TBA)
 Iubire și Onoare ( Love and Honor) - Acasǎ (2010-present)
 Narcisa Sǎlbaticǎ (Wild Narcisa) - Antena 1 (2010-2014)

2011 
 Eu, Tu, El și Ea (Me, You, Him and Her) - Prima TV; sitcom (2011)
 In Derivă - HBO Romania (2010-2013)
 Pariu cu viața - ProTV (2011-present)
 Tanti Florica - ProTV (2012-2013)
 Spitalul de demență - ProTV (2012-2013)

2012 
 Las Fierbinṭi - ProTV (2012-present)

2013 
 Rămâi cu mine - HBO Romania (2013-2014)

2014 
 Umbre - HBO Romania (2014)
 O nouǎ viaṭǎ - Acasä (2014)
 O sǎptămânǎ nebunǎ - Pro TV (2014)
 Fetele lu' domn profesor - Kanal D (2014-2018)

2015 
 Lecții de viață - Pro TV (2015-present)
 Camera Cafe - Antena 1; comedy (2015-2017)

2016 
 Atletico Textila - Pro TV; comedy (2016-2021)
 Deschide ochii - Pro TV; drama (2016)
 Valea Mută - HBO Romania (2016)
 Baieṭi de oras - Antena 1 (2016-2021)

2017 
 Ai noștri - Pro TV; comedy (2017)
 Când mama nu e acasǎ - Happy Channel; drama (2017)
 O grǎmadă de caramele - Happy Channel; drama (2017)

2018 
 Fructul oprit - Antena 1; drama (2018-2019)
 Triplusec - Pro TV; comedy (2018)
 Hackerville - HBO Romania (2018)
 Primǎverii - TVR2; comedy (2018-2019)

2019 
 VLAD - Pro TV; drama (2019-2021)
 Liber ca pasărea cerului - Antena 1; comedy (2019)
 Sacrificul - Antena 1; drama (2019-2020)
 Mangaliṭa - Antena 1; comedy (2019-2020)

2020s

2020 
 Videochat - PRO TV; comedy (2020)
 Bani negri (pentru zile albe) - HBO; action, comedy (2020)

2021 
 Adela - Antena 1; drama, action (2021-2022)
 Poveşti de familie - Antena 1; drama, family (2021-2022)
 Secretele Preşedintelui - Prima TV; comedy (2021-present)

2022 
 Ruxx - HBO Max; drama (2022)
 Strada speranței - Kanal D; comedy (2022)
 Clanul - PRO TV; action, thriller, drama (2022-present)
 Pup-o mă! Înfuntarea bacilor - Prima TV; comedy (2022-present)

2023 
 Lia - Antena 1; drama (2023-present)